Austria participated in the Eurovision Song Contest 2017 with the song "Running on Air" written by Nathan Trent and Bernhard Penzias. The song was performed by Nathan Trent. On 19 December 2016, the Austrian broadcaster Österreichischer Rundfunk (ORF) announced that they had internally selected Nathan Trent to compete at the 2017 contest in Kyiv, Ukraine, while "Running on Air" was presented to the public on 28 February 2017.

Austria was drawn to compete in the second semi-final of the Eurovision Song Contest which took place on 11 May 2017. Performing during the show in position 2, "Running on Air" was announced among the top 10 entries of the second semi-final and therefore qualified to compete in the final on 13 May. It was later revealed that Austria placed seventh out of the 18 participating countries in the semi-final with 147 points. In the final, Austria performed in position 4 and placed sixteenth out of the 26 participating countries, scoring 93 points.

Background 

The Austrian national broadcaster,  (ORF), broadcasts the event within Austria and organises the selection process for the nation's entry. ORF confirmed their intentions to participate at the 2017 Eurovision Song Contest on 28 May 2016. For the 2017 Eurovision Song Contest, ORF held an internal selection to choose the artist and song to represent Austria at the contest.

Before Eurovision

Internal selection 
Artists were nominated by the ORF Eurovision Song Contest Team led by ORF chief editor Stefan Zechner, which collaborated with music experts Christof Straub and Eberhard Forcher, the latter who also worked on the selection of the Austrian entry in 2016, to submit songs to the broadcaster. On 19 December 2016, ORF announced that they had internally selected Nathan Trent to represent Austria in Kyiv. Trent was also among the 33 artists shortlisted to compete in the 2017 German national final but later withdrew in favour of representing Austria at the Eurovision Song Contest 2017. Prior to the announcement of Nathan Trent as the Austrian representative, the band Russkaja was rumoured to have been selected by the broadcaster. On 26 February 2017, the song "Running on Air" written by Nathan Trent himself together with Bernhard Penzias was announced as the Austrian entry for the contest. While its release date was given as 28 February, the song leaked online through Spotify and YouTube the same day as its announcement. The official presentation of the song took place on 28 February 2017 during the radio show Ö3-Wecker, aired on Ö3.

Promotion
Nathan Trent made several appearances across Europe to specifically promote "Running on Air" as the Austrian Eurovision entry. On 2 April, Trent performed during the London Eurovision Party, which was held at the Café de Paris venue in London, United Kingdom and hosted by Nicki French. Between 3 and 6 April, Trent took part in promotional activities in Tel Aviv, Israel and performed during the Israel Calling event held at the Ha'teatron venue. On 8 April, Trent performed during the Eurovision in Concert event which was held at the Melkweg venue in Amsterdam, Netherlands and hosted by Cornald Maas and Selma Björnsdóttir. On 15 April, Trent performed during the Eurovision Spain Pre-Party, which was held at the Sala La Riviera venue in Madrid, Spain.

Trent recorded an Italian version of the song titled "Fino a che volerò" and a remixed Spanish version titled "Aire", which was produced by Vincent Bueno.

At Eurovision 

According to Eurovision rules, all nations with the exceptions of the host country and the "Big Five" (France, Germany, Italy, Spain and the United Kingdom) are required to qualify from one of two semi-finals in order to compete for the final; the top ten countries from each semi-final progress to the final. The European Broadcasting Union (EBU) split up the competing countries into six different pots based on voting patterns from previous contests, with countries with favourable voting histories put into the same pot. On 31 January 2017, a special allocation draw was held which placed each country into one of the two semi-finals, as well as which half of the show they would perform in. Austria was placed into the second semi-final, to be held on 11 May 2017, and was scheduled to perform in the first half of the show.

Once all the competing songs for the 2017 contest had been released, the running order for the semi-finals was decided by the shows' producers rather than through another draw, so that similar songs were not placed next to each other. Austria was set to perform in position 2, following the entry from Serbia and before the entry from Macedonia.

The two semi-finals and the final were broadcast in Austria on ORF eins with commentary by Andi Knoll. The Austrian spokesperson, who announced the top 12-point score awarded by the Austrian jury during the final, was Kristina Inhof.

Semi-final

Cesár Sampson took part in technical rehearsals on 2 and 5 May, followed by dress rehearsals on 10 and 11 May. This included the jury show on 10 May where the professional juries of each country watched and voted on the competing entries.

The Austrian performance featured Nathan Trent performing on stage in a white outfit with silver winged shoes. The performance began with Trent sitting on a large silver crescent moon prop made from the same material as a disco ball with large clouds of purple, white, blue and orange smoke appearing on the LED screens, accompanied by yellow beaming lights from the back of the stage and smoke effects. During the performance, Trent jumped from the moon to the front of the stage and returned to the moon afterwards. The four backing vocalists that joined Nathan Trent at the end of the song were: Vincent Bueno, Helena Dema, Florian Sebastian Fitz and Art Demur.

At the end of the show, Austria was announced as having finished in the top 10 and subsequently qualifying for the grand final. It was later revealed that Austria placed seventh in the semi-final, receiving a total of 147 points: 32 points from the televoting and 115 points from the juries.

Final
Shortly after the second semi-final, a winners' press conference was held for the ten qualifying countries. As part of this press conference, the qualifying artists took part in a draw to determine which half of the grand final they would subsequently participate in. This draw was done in the reverse order the countries appeared in the semi-final running order. Austria was drawn to compete in the first half. Following this draw, the shows' producers decided upon the running order of the final, as they had done for the semi-finals. Austria was subsequently placed to perform in position 4, following the entry from Belarus and before the entry from Armenia.

Nathan Trent once again took part in dress rehearsals on 12 and 13 May before the final, including the jury final where the professional juries cast their final votes before the live show. Nathan Trent performed a repeat of his semi-final performance during the final on 14 May. Austria placed sixteenth in the final, scoring 93 points: 0 points from the televoting and 93 points from the juries.

Voting 
Voting during the three shows involved each country awarding two sets of points from 1-8, 10 and 12: one from their professional jury and the other from televoting. Each nation's jury consisted of five music industry professionals who are citizens of the country they represent, with their names published before the contest to ensure transparency. This jury judged each entry based on: vocal capacity; the stage performance; the song's composition and originality; and the overall impression by the act. In addition, no member of a national jury was permitted to be related in any way to any of the competing acts in such a way that they cannot vote impartially and independently. The individual rankings of each jury member as well as the nation's televoting results were released shortly after the grand final.

Below is a breakdown of points awarded to Austria and awarded by Austria in the second semi-final and grand final of the contest, and the breakdown of the jury voting and televoting conducted during the two shows:

Points awarded to Austria

Points awarded by Austria

Detailed voting results
The following members comprised the Austrian jury:
 Andreas Zahradnik (jury chairperson)journalist
 Christian Udehost, editor, scriptwriter, journalist
  (Elly V)singer
 Sasha Saedilabelhead domestic Austria, artist, repertoire manager
 Zoë Straubsinger, songwriter, actress, represented Austria in the 2016 contest

The fifth member of the jury, Sasha Saedi, was confirmed on 9 May 2017.

References

External links

2017
Countries in the Eurovision Song Contest 2017
Eurovision